Constance Ann Forbes Citro (born June 9, 1942) is an American political scientist and statistician. She is the former director of the Committee on National Statistics of the National Academies of Sciences, Engineering, and Medicine and works as a senior scholar for the Committee on National Statistics.

Education and career
Constance Ann Forbes was born on June 9, 1942, in St. Louis, Missouri, to Gilbert B. Forbes, a pediatrician, and Grace Moehlman Forbes. She was the granddaughter of Baptist minister and theological scholar Conrad Henry Moehlman.

She studied political science as an undergraduate at the University of Rochester, graduating Phi Beta Kappa in 1963. Her father was on the faculty of the U of R Medical School, and numerous relatives were graduates, including both her parents, her late husband, Dr. Joseph F. Citro (1941-2020), whom she married on June 19, 1965, and their son Jeremy F. Citro. She went to Yale University for a master's degree and Ph.D. in political science, studying under James David Barber.

Citro joined the Committee on National Statistics in 1984 and directed the committee from 2004 to 2017. She was previously vice president of Mathematica Policy Research, vice president of Data Use and Access Laboratories (DUALabs), and social science analyst with the US Census Bureau.

Recognition
Citro became a Fellow of the American Statistical Association in 1987. She is an elected member of the International Statistical Institute.

She was the winner of the 1997 Roger Herriot Award for Innovation in Federal Statistics, for contributions including directing panel studies on poverty measurement, microsimulation for social welfare programs, and the 1990 and 2000 censuses.
She also won the Waksberg Award in survey methodology in 2014.

In 2018 the American Statistical Association established an annual award, the Links Lecture Award, "to honor the contributions of Constance Citro, Robert Groves, and Fritz Scheuren".

References

1942 births
Living people
American women statisticians
University of Rochester alumni
Yale Graduate School of Arts and Sciences alumni
Elected Members of the International Statistical Institute
Fellows of the American Statistical Association
American women political scientists
American political scientists
21st-century American women